Kwabena Agouda (born 25 April 1985 in Accra) is a Ghanaian professional football striker, currently playing for Hapoel Bnei Lod FC.

Career 
Agouda also played for Nania F.C. (Ghana), where he scored 45 goals in 67 games, he arrived in Europe to join FC St. Gallen in 2004. In summer 2006 loaned out to FC Winterthur in the Swiss Challenge League (2nd level), his loan contract will last until the end of this year. He was a member of FC St. Gallen since joining them in 2004 from FC Nania. He scored 1 goal in 20 games.until January 2007 and in January 2008 joined Bnei Lod, after 6 months was transferred to Hapoel Ironi Kiryat Shmona F.C.

References

1985 births
Living people
Ghanaian footballers
F.C. Nania players
FC St. Gallen players
FC Winterthur players
Swiss Super League players
Swiss Challenge League players
Liga Leumit players
Israeli Premier League players
Hapoel Bnei Lod F.C. players
Hapoel Ironi Kiryat Shmona F.C. players
Hapoel Ashkelon F.C. players
Hapoel Kfar Saba F.C. players
Ghanaian expatriate sportspeople in Israel
Expatriate footballers in Israel
Association football forwards